Dracena is a municipality in the state of São Paulo in Brazil. The population is 45,847 (2015 est.) in an area of 488 km². The elevation is 421 m.

The municipality contains part of the  Rio do Peixe State Park, created in 2002.

History 
Dracena was founded on December 8, 1945 on the initiative of Irio Spinardi, João Vandramini, Virgílio and Florêncio Fioravanti. It grew rapidly, and became an independent municipality in 1953, when it was separated from Gracianópolis.

Climate

Notable people
Rodrigo Caio Association Football player

References

External links 
 Official Page of Dracena in Portuguese